

Thomsen is a Danish patronymic surname meaning "son of Tom (or Thomas)", itself derived from the Aramaic תום or Tôm, meaning "twin".  There are many varied surname spellings, with the first historical record believed to be found in 1252.  Thomsen is uncommon as a given name.

People with the surname Thomsen include:

B 
 Britta Thomsen (born 1954), Danish politician and member of the European Parliament

C 
 Cecilie Thomsen (born 1974), Danish actress and model
 Christian Jürgensen Thomsen (1788–1865), Danish archaeologist
 Claus Thomsen (born 1970), Danish former professional footballer

E 
 Ebba Thomsen (1887–1973), Danish actress

F 
 Finn Thomsen (born 1955), Danish motorcycle speedway rider
 Fred Thomsen (1897–1986), American college football player and coach

G 
 Gerhard Thomsen (1899-1934), German mathematician who worked in various branches of geometry
 Grímur Thomsen (1820–1896), Icelandic poet and editor
 Grover C. Thomsen, Danish-American chemist who created the soft drink Big Red (drink) in 1937
 Gunnar H. Thomsen, Faroese musician and member of Týr (band), a Faroese heavy metal band active 1998–present

H 
 Hans Peter Jørgen Julius Thomsen (1826–1909), Danish chemist noted in thermochemistry for the Thomsen–Berthelot principle
 Hasse Thomsén (1942–2004), Swedish heavyweight boxer

I 
 Ib Thomsen (born 1961), Norwegian politician

K 
 Knud Vad Thomsen (1905–1971) Danish composer

L 
 Linda Chatman Thomsen (born 1954), American lawyer and public servant
 Lynn Thomsen (born 1964), former American football player

M 
 Mads Thomsen (born 1989), Danish former professional football forward
 Mark A. Thomsen (born 1956), American operatic tenor
 Marlene Thomsen (born 1971), Danish former badminton player 
 Martha Thomsen (born 1957), American model
 Martinus Thomsen (1890–1981), Danish writer and mystic
 Moritz Thomsen (1915–1991), American farmer and writer
 Maximo Thomsen (1999), Argentine former rugbier, leader of Los Demoledores

P 
 Philipp Thomsen, a perpetually drunken Kriegsmarine submarine commander in the book and film Das Boot
 Pia Thomsen, Danish cricketer
 Poul Mathias Thomsen, Danish economist working for the International Monetary Fund

S 
 Søren Ulrik Thomsen (born 1956), Danish poet
 Stu Thomsen (born 1958), American former bicycle motocross (BMX) racer
 Sven Thomsen (1884–1968), Danish competitive sailor

T 
 Till Thomsen, German curler
 Tina Thomsen (born 1975), Danish-born Australian actress
 Tue Bjørn Thomsen (1972–2006), Danish professional boxer

U 
 Ulrich Thomsen (born 1963), Danish actor

V 
 Vern Thomsen, American college football coach, 1983–1987
 Vilhelm Thomsen (1842–1927), Danish linguist

References

See also
 Thomson (surname)
 Thompson (surname)
 Thomason (disambiguation)

Danish-language surnames
Patronymic surnames
Surnames from given names